Happy Days  is a 1929 American pre-Code musical film directed by Benjamin Stoloff, which was the first feature film shown entirely in widescreen anywhere in the world, filmed using the Fox Grandeur 70 mm process. French director Abel Gance's Napoléon (1927) had a final widescreen segment in what Gance called Polyvision. Paramount released Old Ironsides (1927), with two sequences in a widescreen process called "Magnascope", while MGM released Trail of '98 (1928) in a widescreen process called "Fanthom Screen".

The film features an array of stars who were contracted to William Fox's  Fox Film Corporation at that time, including Marjorie White, Will Rogers, Charles Farrell, Janet Gaynor, George Jessel, El Brendel, Ann Pennington, Victor McLaglen, Dixie Lee, Edmund Lowe, and Frank Richardson. It also featured the first appearance of Betty Grable on film, aged 12, as a chorus girl, and Sir Harry Lauder's nephew, Harry Lauder II, a conductor for Fox, who was drafted into the chorus.

Plot
Originally titled New Orleans Frolic, the story centers around Margie (played by Marjorie White), a singer on a showboat who, when she hears that the showboat is in financial trouble, travels to New York City in an effort to persuade all the boat's former stars to perform in a show to rescue it. She is successful and the stars all fly to New Orleans to surprise the showboat's owner, Colonel Billy Blacher, with a grand show, the proceeds of which will go to rescue the showboat.

Cast
Charles E. Evans as Colonel Billy Batcher
Marjorie White as Margie
Richard Keene as Dick
Stuart Erwin as Jig
Martha Lee Sparks as Nancy Lee
Clifford Dempsey as Sheriff Benton
James J. Corbett as Interlocutor - Minstrel Show
George MacFarlane as Interlocutor - Minstrel Show
Janet Gaynor as Janet Gaynor
Charles Farrell as Charles Farrell
Victor McLaglen as Minstrel Show Performer
Edmund Lowe as Minstrel Show Performer
El Brendel as Minstrel Show Performer
William Collier Sr. as End Man - Minstrel Show
Walter Catlett as End Man - Minstrel Show
Tom Patricola as Minstrel Show Performer
George Jessel as Minstrel Show Performer
Will Rogers as Minstrel Show Performer
Warner Baxter as Minstrel Show Performer
Ann Pennington as "Snake Hips" Speciality Dancer

Release
After a preview on September 17, 1929, Happy Days premiered at the Roxy Theater in New York City on February 13, 1930 with a Niagara Falls widescreen short on a Grandeur screen of 42x20 ft, compared to the standard 24x18 ft screen. It was also shown in Grandeur at the Carthay Circle Theatre in Los Angeles, from February 28, 1930.

At a screening at the Roxy Theater, film critic Mordaunt Hall praised the cinematography, which was noted to be enhanced by the wider format. However, he regarded the film itself as "not one that gives as full a conception of the possibilities as future films of this type will probably do."

Owing to the Great Depression, few movie theaters invested in equipment for this format and it was soon abandoned. Fox Film Corporation's heavy investment in Grandeur technology led to William Fox losing his business, which was eventually merged in 1935 with Twentieth Century Pictures to form 20th Century Fox. No widescreen print of Happy Days is known to have survived.

References

External links

A Fancy Lady and the Winnipeg Kid at Vitaphone Varieties (posters, ads, and still)

1929 films
1930 films
Fox Film films
American black-and-white films
Films directed by Benjamin Stoloff
1920s musical films
Films produced by William Fox
American musical films
1930s English-language films
1920s English-language films
1920s American films
1930s American films